Anthony Higgins (born 9 May 1947) is an English stage, film and television actor.

Career
Higgins started acting in school and Cosmopolitan Club theatre plays, taking the lead in 'Treasure Island', 'Sweeney Todd', and 'The Beggar's Uproar' (sic). After graduation he studied at the school of the Birmingham Repertory Theatre Company. In 1967 he became a professional stage actor. He received positive reviews for his performance as Romeo in Romeo and Juliet at Birmingham Repertory. He worked onstage in Coventry and at the Chichester Festival in Chichester. One of his first television appearances was a pivotal role in a 1968 episode of the TV series Journey to the Unknown with Janice Rule. Another television appearance was in Strange Report (1969) with Anthony Quayle. Higgins' first successes in cinema were: A Walk with Love and Death by John Huston with Anjelica Huston (1969), Something for Everyone (1970) with Michael York and Angela Lansbury, Taste the Blood of Dracula (1970), with Christopher Lee, and a cult film Vampire Circus (1972).

In all the films of his early career until 1975, Higgins was credited as 'Anthony Corlan' due to the similarity of his real name to that of another actor. 

There followed a period of television and plays for the Royal Shakespeare Company, the National Theatre and other British theatre productions. In 1970 he played Boris in the BBC TV series The Roads to Freedom based on the Jean-Paul Sartre trilogy. In 1976 he played a supporting role in a popular British television series, Hadleigh. In 1977 he played the lead role in a BBC series The Eagle of the Ninth, based on Rosemary Sutcliff's 1954 book. In 1980 he was Juan in Love in a Cold Climate and in 1981 played the supporting role of Major Gobler in the feature film, Raiders of the Lost Ark, starring Harrison Ford and directed by Steven Spielberg. Higgins won Best Actor of 1979 from Time Out magazine for his work with the Royal Shakespeare Company that year.

Higgins played the role of Stephan in the American film production of Quartet opposite French actress Isabelle Adjani in 1981. In the same year the British director Peter Greenaway chose Higgins for the leading role in his breakthrough film The Draughtsman's Contract. In 1985 Higgins appeared as the cuckolded husband in Nagisa Oshima's Max, Mon Amour with Charlotte Rampling. In 1985 he acted opposite Sting in The Bride, a version of Bride of Frankenstein. Throughout the 1980s Higgins appeared in supporting roles in many television series such as Lace, Napoleon and Josephine: A Love Story, with Armand Assante, and Reilly, Ace of Spies, with Sam Neill. He went to Australia to play the lead as Sir Laurence Olivier in an Australian made-for-television film, Darlings of the Gods, about the time spent in Australia by Olivier and Vivien Leigh.

In 1991 Higgins played Johann Strauss I in the Austrian-produced, made-for-television series, The Strauss Dynasty, which was filmed in Austria with many well-known actors and aired internationally. He played both Sherlock Holmes and Holmes' enemy Professor Moriarty, in two different decades of his career. He was the villain Rathe (not yet going by the name Moriarty) in Young Sherlock Holmes (1985), and played Sherlock Holmes himself in Sherlock Holmes Returns (1993). In 1993 he played a lead part in the film Sweet Killing. In 2005 he appeared in Chromophobia. He played General Jacques Francois Dugommier in 2007 in Heroes and Villains: Napoleon. In 2009 he appeared in Lewis, Law & Order: UK, and Agatha Christie's Marple ("The Secret of Chimneys").

Filmography
FilmA Walk with Love and Death (1969) as Robert of Loris (as Anthony Corlan)Taste the Blood of Dracula (1970) as Paul Paxton (as Anthony Corlan)Something for Everyone (1970) as Helmuth Von Ornstein (as Anthony Corlan)Vampire Circus (1972) as Emil (as Anthony Corlan)Flavia the Heretic (1974) as Ahmed (as Anthony Corlan)Voyage of the Damned (1976) as Seaman Heinz BergQuartet (1981) as Stephan ZelliRaiders of the Lost Ark (1981) as Major GoblerThe Draughtsman's Contract (1982) as Mr. NevilleThe Bride (1985) as ClervalShe'll Be Wearing Pink Pyjamas (1985) as TomYoung Sherlock Holmes (1985) as Professor RatheMax, Mon Amour (1986) as Peter JonesThe Bridge (1992) as Reginald HetheringtonSweet Killing (1993) as Adam CrosseFor Love or Money (1993) as Christian HanoverNostradamus (1994) as King Henry IIIndian Summer (1996) as RamonThe Fifth Province (1997) as MarcelBandyta (1997) as Prison's DirectorDeeply (2000) as Adm. GriggsThe Last Minute (2001) as WalshChromophobia (2005) as Geoffrey WhartonMalice in Wonderland (2009) as RexBel Ami (2012) as Comte de VaudrecUnited Passions (2014) as Lord Kinnaird

TelevisionBlood of the Lamb (1969) (as Anthony Corlan) as AlecThe Roads to Freedom (1970) as BorisArmchair Theatre (1972) as AdolphThe Rivals of Sherlock Holmes (1973) as William HazeldeneHadleigh (1976) as Gregory BakerWings (1977) as Lt. Wollerton The Eagle of the Ninth (1977) as Marcus Flavius AquilaDanton's Death (1978) as Camille  Love in a Cold Climate (1980) as JuanTales of the Unexpected (1983) as Cassan Reilly, Ace of Spies (1983) as TrilisserLace (1984) as Prince AbdullahThe Cold Room (1984) as ErichLace II (1985) as King Abdullah of SydonThe Shutter Falls (1986) as PhotographerThe Last Seance (1986) as RaoulNapoleon and Josephine: A Love Story (1987) as JosephDarlings of the Gods (1989) as Laurence OlivierThe Strauss Dynasty (1991) as Johann StraussOne Against the Wind (1991) as SS Capt. Herman Gruber1994 Baker Street: Sherlock Holmes Returns (1993) as Sherlock HolmesThe Governor (1995) as Norman JonesMoses (1995) as KorahSupply & Demand (1997) as Lloyd St JohnClose Relations (1998) as RobertTrial & Retribution III (1999) as Karl WildingPeak Practice (2000) as Paul Redman The Inspector Lynley Mysteries: A Traitor to Memory (2004) as James PitchleyJudge John Deed (2005) as Sir Maurice Avebury The Commander: Blackdog (2005) as David SperryHeroes and Villains: Napoleon (2007) as General DugommierLewis (2009) as FrancoLaw & Order: UK (2009) as Ed ConnorMarple (2010) as Count LudwigZen (2011) as Eduardo GuerchiniTutankhamun'' (2016) as Theodore Davis

References

External links
 

1947 births
Actors from Northamptonshire
English male television actors
English male film actors
English people of Irish descent
Living people
People from Northampton